Joseph Vidal (5 March 1933 – 9 July 2020) was a French politician. In 2002, he became a Knight of the Legion of Honour.

References

1933 births
2020 deaths